Pangrapta is a genus of moths in the family Erebidae. The genus was erected by Jacob Hübner in 1818.

Species
Pangrapta acolesis Viette, 1958 Madagascar
Pangrapta adoxopis (Turner, 1908) northern Queensland
Pangrapta adusta (Leech, 1900)
Pangrapta albipuncta Gaede, 1940 Cameroon
Pangrapta albirenalis Gaede, 1940 Malawi
Pangrapta albiseriata Hampson, 1926 Borneo
Pangrapta albistigma (Hampson, 1898) India (Meghalaya)
Pangrapta argyrographa (Mabille, 1893) Madagascar
Pangrapta aroa Bethune-Baker, 1906 New Guinea
Pangrapta athemonalis (Walker, [1859]) Borneo
Pangrapta aviusalis (Walker, [1859]) Borneo
Pangrapta camerunia Hampson, 1926 Cameroon
Pangrapta cana (Leech, 1900)
Pangrapta chilana (Swinhoe, 1902) Borneo
Pangrapta cinerea (Butler, 1889) India (Himachal Pradesh)
Pangrapta costaemacula Staudinger, 1888 south-eastern Siberia
Pangrapta costinotata (Butler, 1881) Japan
Pangrapta cryptoleuca Hampson, 1926 New Guinea
Pangrapta curtalis (Walker, [1866]) Shanghai
Pangrapta decoralis Hübner, 1818 Nova Scotia, New York, Georgia, Florida
Pangrapta dentilineata (Leech, 1900) western China
Pangrapta dialitha Hampson, 1926 Borneo
Pangrapta disruptalis (Walker, [1866]) Shanghai
Pangrapta dulcis Berio, 1956 Zaire
Pangrapta elassa Hampson, 1926 Ghana
Pangrapta enigmaria (Swinhoe, 1905) India (Meghalaya)
Pangrapta eucraspeda Hampson, 1926 Cameroon
Pangrapta fauvealis Viette, 1965 Madagascar
Pangrapta ferrugineiceps (Hampson, 1896) Bhutan
Pangrapta flavomacula Staudinger, 1888 south-eastern Siberia
Pangrapta franeyae Viette, 1979 Madagascar
Pangrapta grisangula (Hampson, 1891) India (Tamil Nadu)
Pangrapta griseola Staudinger, 1892 south-eastern Siberia
Pangrapta hampsoni Viette, 1966 Madagascar
Pangrapta holophaea Hampson, 1926 Singapore
Pangrapta hylaxalis (Walker, [1859]) Borneo, Nias
Pangrapta hyriona (Hampson, 1926) Borneo
Pangrapta indentalis (Leech, 1889) Japan
Pangrapta ingratata (Leech, 1900) western China
Pangrapta laevis Berio, 1956 Zaire
Pangrapta loricalis Geyer, 1837
Pangrapta lunulata Seitz, 1915 south-eastern Siberia
Pangrapta macariana Hampson, 1926 Singapore
Pangrapta mandarina (Leech, 1900)
Pangrapta marmorata Staudinger, 1888 south-eastern Siberia
Pangrapta melacleptra Hampson, 1926 Mozambique
Pangrapta mesacta Hampson, 1926 Bhutan
Pangrapta metagona (Walker, 1864) Borneo
Pangrapta minor Sugi, 1982 Japan
Pangrapta molybdina Hampson, 1926 India (Meghalaya)
Pangrapta nigra (Bethune-Baker, 1906) New Guinea
Pangrapta obscurata (Butler, 1879) Japan
Pangrapta ornata (Leech, 1900)
Pangrapta pannosa (Moore, 1882) India (Meghalaya, West Bengal)
Pangrapta parsimonalis (Walker, [1859]) Borneo
Pangrapta parvula (Leech, 1900)
Pangrapta pelidna Hampson, 1926 China (Hupeh)
Pangrapta pensilis Felder & Rogenhofer, 1874 Japan
Pangrapta perturbans (Walker, 1858) Bangladesh
Pangrapta pexifera Hampson, 1926 Madagascar
Pangrapta pictipennis (Hampson, 1895) Trivandrum
Pangrapta plumbilineata Wileman & West, 1929 Taiwan
Pangrapta porphyrea (Butler, 1879) Japan
Pangrapta pratti Bethune-Baker, 1906 New Guinea
Pangrapta pulverea (Leech, 1900)
Pangrapta rufia Schaus, 1894 Brazil (Rio de Janeiro)
Pangrapta saucia (Leech, 1900)
Pangrapta seriopuncta Hampson, 1926 Sierra Leone
Pangrapta shivula (Guenée, 1852) Bangladesh
Pangrapta similistigma Warren, 1913
Pangrapta sphragis Möschler, 1880 Suriname
Pangrapta squamea (Leech, 1900)
Pangrapta suaveola Staudinger, 1888 south-eastern Siberia
Pangrapta taenaria Möschler, 1880 Suriname
Pangrapta talusalis (Walker, [1859]) India
Pangrapta textilis (Leech, 1889) Korea
Pangrapta thetys Felder & Rogenhofer, 1874 Brazil (Amazonas)
Pangrapta tipula (Swinhoe, 1893) Shan States
Pangrapta transducta Hampson, 1926 Myanmar
Pangrapta trilineata (Leech, 1900)
Pangrapta trimatesalis (Walker, [1859]) Bangladesh
Pangrapta umrosa Leech, 1900
Pangrapta vaga (Walker, 1865) Bangladesh
Pangrapta variegata Rothschild, 1920 Sumatra
Pangrapta vasava (Butler, 1881) south-eastern Siberia, Japan
Pangrapta yoshinensis Wileman & West, 1929 Japan
Pangrapta bicornuta Galsworthy, 1997 Hong Kong

References

Pangraptinae
Moth genera